Ave Maria Mutual Funds is a U.S. mutual fund family that targets clients interested in financially sound investments in companies that do not violate certain religious principles of the Catholic Church. Often described as socially responsible investing (SRI), this practice is more accurately in the case of Ave Maria Mutual Funds called morally responsible investing (MRI) or faith-based investing.

History
The first of its funds was established in 2001. As of December 31, 2021, the Ave Maria Mutual Funds had over $3.0 billion in assets under management.

Most of that money is invested in the Ave Maria Rising Dividend Fund (Ticker: AVEDX), the firm's flagship fund, Ave Maria Growth Fund (AVEGX) and Ave Maria Value Fund (AVEMX).  Other funds include Ave Maria Bond Fund (AVEFX), Ave Maria World Equity Fund (AVEWX) and Ave Maria Focused Fund (AVEAX).

The six Ave Maria Mutual Funds are managed by Plymouth, Michigan-based Schwartz Investment Counsel, Inc.   The firm was established in 1980 by George P. Schwartz, CFA. There is also an Ave Maria Money Market Account, which is really a money market fund managed by Pittsburgh, PA based Federated Investors.

The Catholic Equity Fund merged into Ave Maria Rising Dividend Fund on March 30, 2007.  Schwartz also began offering an Ave Maria Separately Managed Account (Ave Maria SMA) product in late 2009.

Investments
According to the fund family prospectus and website, the company screens its investments first on financial criteria, then eliminates companies involved in the practice of abortion or whose policies are morally (though not necessarily ethically) anti-family. What constitutes anti-family practices is based on moral judgments made by the company's Catholic Advisory Board and the Catechism of the Catholic Church. Examples cited by the fund family include companies distributing pornography, and companies with policies that they view undermine the sacrament of marriage. Involvement with contraception and infanticide (aka abortion) also disqualify a company from the fund, as does embryonic stem cell research. Unlike other ethical funds, however, it does not reject defense companies, alcohol, or tobacco (other common SRI-screened areas).

Catholic Advisory Board
In defining its process for screening investments based on religious principles, the board members are "guided by the magisterium of the Catholic Church and actively seek the advice and counsel of Catholic clergy". As of November 28, 2022, the board consists of the following members:

 Raymond Arroyo
 Lou Holtz, Emeritus
 Larry Kudlow
 Tom Monaghan
 Melissa Moschella
 Scott Hahn
 Paul R. Roney
 Father John Riccardo, Emeritus

The board's episcopal advisors are Cardinal Adam Maida and Archbishop Allen Vigneron.

Former Board Members
 Bowie Kuhn, Founding Chairman (1926-2007)
 Michael Novak
 Phyllis Schlafly

References

External links 
 Ave Maria Mutual Funds website
 Putting your money where your faith is, a story from The Osgood File
 Kiplingers.com Article
 Forbes Article

Mutual funds of the United States
Catholic lay organisations
Ethical investment